Střela is a village, a local part of the town Strakonice in the district of Strakonice, the Czech Republic. It is located less than 4 km west of Strakonice; the Kolčavka stream flows through it, which feeds Střelský pond in the village and a few hundred meters further flows into the Otava river on the left. In the eastern extremity of the cadastral territory of Střela, there is also the old settlement of Virt, which is a separate registered part of the city and divides the local part of Střela into two parts. The village is crossed by road I/22 connecting Strakonice and Horažďovice.

History 
The first owner of the village was Martin of Střela in 1242, but the first written mention of the castle with the pool court dates back to 1318. In 1720, its owners, the Jesuits from Klatovy, built a baroque castle on the site of the partially demolished castle. It is a one-story building with a D-shaped floor plan and a late baroque facade. Unique parquet floors are preserved inside. Later, the castle housed a special school with a boarding school and finally the district archive. Today, the Střela castle with the park is once again in private ownership. The castle and the granary below it are protected as Cultural Monuments of the Czech Republic.

Gallery

References 

Villages in Strakonice District